Cucknell's Wood is a   nature reserve south-east of Shamley Green in Surrey. It is managed by the Surrey Wildlife Trust.

Birds in this 400 year old semi-natural wood include great spotted woodpecker, lesser spotted woodpecker, willow tit, treecreeper, nuthatch, goldcrest, green woodpecker and tawny owl. There are mammals such as dormice.

There is access from Stroud Lane.

References

Surrey Wildlife Trust